McGregor may refer to:

People
 McGregor (surname)
 Clan MacGregor, a Scottish highland clan
 McGregor W. Scott (born 1962), U.S. attorney

Characters
 Mr. McGregor, a fictional character from Peter Rabbit

Places

in Canada:
 McGregor Lake, Alberta; a lake
 McGregor, British Columbia
 McGregor Plateau, Nechaka Plateau, Interior Plateau, British Columbia; a mountainous plateau
 McGregor Range, Central Interior, British Columbia; a mountain range
 McGregor Pass, Continental Divide, British Columbia; a mountain pass
 McGregor River, British Columbia; a river
 McGregor, Ontario

in South Africa:
 McGregor, Western Cape

in the United States:
 McGregor, Florida
 McGregor, Georgia
 McGregor, Iowa
 McGregor Heights, Iowa
 McGregor, Minnesota
 McGregor Township, Aitkin County, Minnesota
 Mount McGregor (mountain), New York
 McGregor, North Dakota
 McGregor, Armstrong County, Pennsylvania
 McGregor, Texas
 McGregor Independent School District
 McGregor Mountain (Washington)

elsewhere:
 McGregor Glacier, Prince Olav Mountains, Antarctica
 Sir Arthur McGregor Municipality, Anzoátegui, Venezuela
 McGregor Street, Wan Chai, Hong Kong Island, Victoria, Hong Kong, China

Facilities and structures
 McGregor station (British Columbia), Canada; a train station
 McGregor (Port Gibson, Mississippi), USA; a house listed on the U.S. National Register of Historic Places
 McGregor Links, a golf course in Saratoga Springs, New York, USA
 McGregor High School (Minnesota), USA
 McGregor High School (Texas), USA
 McGregor station (Texas), USA; a train station

Other uses
 "McGregor" (song), a 2021 song by 'Anuel AA' off the album Las Leyendas Nunca Mueren
 McGregor and Company, a heavy engineering company of New Zealand

See also

Mount McGregor (disambiguation)
MacGregor (disambiguation)
Gregor (disambiguation)